Zogno is a comune (municipality) in the Province of Bergamo in the Italian region of Lombardy, located about  northeast of Milan and about  north of Bergamo.  

Zogno borders the following municipalities: Algua, Alzano Lombardo, Bracca, Brembilla, Costa di Serina, Nembro, Ponteranica, San Pellegrino Terme, Sedrina, Sorisole.

Among the sites in the church are the 17th century church of San Lorenzo Martire and the modern-style church of the Santuario di Maria Santissima Regina.

References

External links
 http://www.comune.zogno.bg.it/